Ever Augusto Valencia Ruiz (born on 23 January 1997) is a footballer from Colombia who plays as an attacking midfielder for Atlético Bucaramanga on loan from Independiente Medellín.

References

External links
 

1997 births
Living people
Colombian footballers
Independiente Medellín footballers
Wisła Kraków players
Cúcuta Deportivo footballers
Atlético Bucaramanga footballers
Categoría Primera A players
Ekstraklasa players
Colombia under-20 international footballers
Colombia youth international footballers
Expatriate footballers in Poland
Colombian expatriate sportspeople in Poland
Association football midfielders
People from Villavicencio